Taranga (a Sanskrit and Pali word meaning wave) may refer to:

 Taranga (clothing), worn by Kashmiri women
 Taranga (Jain temple), Jain pilgrimage site in Gujarat, India
 Taranga (magazine), a weekly Kannada magazine
 Taranga (Māori mythology), the mother of the Māori demigod Māui
 Taranga, Nepal, a village development committee in Nepal
 Taranga (Hen) Island, the largest island of the Hen and Chicken Islands
 Jnan Taranga, the first community radio service in North-East India
 An alternative name for the 1929 film Under the Southern Cross